Jean-Paul Garnier (died 14 February 1869, Paris), usually known as Paul Garnier, was a 19th-century French watchmaker and mechanic. He is best known for providing railway stations in France, Argentina and built the clock placed in the tower made by Alexander gustave eiffel, located in the park of Montecristi Dominican Republic  and Romania with station clocks.

References

1869 deaths
Year of birth missing
Businesspeople from Paris
French watchmakers (people)
French clockmakers
Place of birth missing